Naik Saif Ali Janjua (Urdu: سیف علی جنجوعہ; c. 25 April 1922 – 26 October 1948), was a Pakistan Army Non-commissioned officer of the Azad Kashmir Regiment, he was a platoon commander during the Indo-Pakistani War of 1947. He received the Hilal-e-Kashmir from the government of Azad Kashmir, which is equal to Nishan-e-Haider, the highest military award given by Pakistan, and now declared as Nishan-e-Haider. He fought in the Kashmir sector during the 1948 War and was killed during the siege of Bhudha Khanna.

Early life 
He was born to a family of Janjua tribe on 25 April 1922 in Khandhaar Tehsil Fateh pur thakyala (Azad Jammu and Kashmir).

Military career 
He was enlisted in the Royal Corps of Engineers in the British Indian Army on 18 March 1941. After completing his service in the British Indian Army in 1947, he returned to his native town and started establishing Haidri Force with the support of Sardar Fateh Muhammad Karailvi. On 1 January 1948, Haidri Force was raised as "Sher-e-Riasti Battalion" under the command of Lt. Col. Muhammad Sher Khan. Due to his service, he was given the rank of Naik and was made a platoon commander. He set personal examples of bravery and inflicted heavy losses on the enemy at Bhudha Khanna. While deployed there, he faced constant frontal and crossfire from opposition machine guns. He defended his post, which he had established earlier with the help of a few jawans, and repulsed many aggressive ventures by the enemy and imposed significant losses on them. The enemy used every means to capture the post with two companies' attacks and heavy shelling but he still managed to retain his post with just a handful of men. During the course of action, he was hit in the chest by artillery fire, ultimately dying on 26 October 1948. On 14 March 1949, the Defence Council of Azad Jammu & Kashmir adorned him with Hilal-e-Kashmir (posthumous), and on 30 November 1995 the Government of Pakistan declared his Hilal-e-Kashmir equivalent to Nishan-e-Haider.

References

External links

1922 births
1948 deaths
Pakistani military personnel killed in action
Pakistani military engineers
Pahari Pothwari people
People from Kotli District
People of the Indo-Pakistani War of 1947